The 35th Republican People's Party Ordinary Convention took place on 16 and 17 January 2016, having originally been scheduled for 2014. The convention date was pushed back from 2014, when it was supposed to be held two years after the previous in 2012, due to the 18th Extraordinary Convention that was held in September 2014. It w held shortly after the CHP's defeat in the November 2015 general election. The party was expected to see challengers to the leadership of Kemal Kılıçdaroğlu, however, Kılıçdaroğlu was re-elected with no other candidate challenging him.

In November 2015, Kılıçdaroğlu ruled out any prospect of holding an Extraordinary Convention prior to the scheduled Ordinary Convention despite calls from some CHP MPs, claiming that the preparations for the Ordinary Convention had already begun.

Leadership election

Candidates

Standing

Kemal Kılıçdaroğlu, Member of Parliament for İzmir's second electoral district and incumbent leader of the CHP (announced 14 November 2015)
Mustafa Balbay, Member of Parliament for İzmir's second electoral district and former defendant in the Ergenekon trials (announced 11 November 2015)

Possible

Metin Feyzioğlu, President of the Turkish Bars Association
İlhan Cihaner, Member of Parliament for Denizli
Selin Sayek Böke, Member of Parliament for İzmir's second electoral district and deputy leader of the CHP responsible for economic policy
Aykut Erdoğdu, Member of Parliament for İstanbul
Ümit Kocasakal, President of the İstanbul Bar Association

Declined
Tuncay Özkan, Member of Parliament for İzmir (I) who was incriminated during the Ergenekon trials. Announced his support for Kemal Kılıçdaroğlu on 13 November 2015.

Withdrew

Muharrem İnce, Member of Parliament for Yalova (announced 9 November 2015). Withdrew 11 January 2016.
Umut Oran, Vice President of Socialist International, former CHP deputy leader and former Member of Parliament for İstanbul's third electoral district (announced 4 November 2015).'' Withdrew on 14 January 2016.

Nomination process
Out of the 1,275 delegates taking part in the voting process, a candidate needed 127 signatures to contest the leadership election.

Results

References

Ordinary Conventions of the Republican People's Party (Turkey)
2016 conferences
January 2016 events in Turkey